Barnardsville is an unincorporated community and census-designated place (CDP) in Buncombe County, North Carolina, United States. It was first listed as a CDP in the 2020 census with a population of 559.

Located on Ivy Creek, the settlement is part of the Asheville Metropolitan Statistical Area.

History 
Barnard's Inn was established at the settlement by Hezekiah and Hester Barnard in the early 1800s.

A post office was established in 1875.

Barnardsville incorporated in 1959, and established its own police force and fire department.  The town dissolved its incorporation in 1965 for financial reasons.

Community

Located at the settlement is an elementary school, a restaurant, a post office, many churches, and the Big Ivy Community Center, where Mountain Heritage Day is celebrated on the first Saturday of October.

Demographics

2020 census

Note: the US Census treats Hispanic/Latino as an ethnic category. This table excludes Latinos from the racial categories and assigns them to a separate category. Hispanics/Latinos can be of any race.

References 

Unincorporated communities in North Carolina
Asheville metropolitan area
Unincorporated communities in Buncombe County, North Carolina
Census-designated places in North Carolina
Census-designated places in Buncombe County, North Carolina